The presidential state car of the Republic of China is the official car used by the President during his/her official duty.

History
Since the second presidential term of Chen Shui-bian in 2004, the president had been using the BMW 740Li brand. In 2016, it was switched to Audi A8L which was delivered in April 2016 ahead of the first presidential term of Tsai Ing-wen.

Specifications
The cars were modified with armor plates to be bulletproof.

Cost
The car in which the president seats cost approximately NT$24.9 million.

Accompanying cars costed about NT$31.09 million for nine units which was procured by the National Security Bureau. The procurement came after the open tender won by VW Taiwan which outbid Pan German Motors, the official agent of BMW in Taiwan, by NT$3.82 million.

See also
 Vice presidential state car (Republic of China)

References

Road transport of heads of state
Presidents of the Republic of China
Vehicles of Taiwan